Immaculate Heart High School and Middle School is a private, Catholic, college preparatory day school for young women grades 6-12. The school is located in the Los Feliz neighborhood in Los Angeles, California, United States, at the intersection of Franklin Avenue and Western Avenue. There are approximately 200 students in the middle school (grades 6–8) and over 550 in the high school (grades 9–12).

History
The school is located in the Roman Catholic Archdiocese of Los Angeles. It was founded by the Sisters of the Immaculate Heart of Mary  in 1906 as a girl's day and boarding school. Although the school  remains on its original site, much  of the original Spanish Mission style convent, classrooms and boarders' dormitories were torn down in 1973. The graduation ceremony for the senior class is traditionally held at the Hollywood Bowl. By far the majority of its more than 10,000 graduates have continued their education at colleges and universities across the country. They have served as artists, musicians, educators, journalists, doctors, lawyers, judges, and stars of stage and screen.

Notable alumnae

 Karen Gaviola, director
 Lucie Arnaz, actress
 Tyra Banks, model and TV personality
 Elizabeth Baur, actress
 Charlotte Caffey, musician
 Pat Carroll, actress
 Linda Dangcil, actress
 Diane Disney, daughter of Walt and Lillian Disney
 Elliot Fletcher, actor and trans advocate
 Margaret McFall-Ngai, animal physiologist and biochemist
 Mary Tyler Moore, actress
 Ruth Nelson, actress
Patricia Newcomb, film producer and publicist
 Gigi Perreau, actress
 Ione Skye, actress
 Yara Shahidi, actress
 Dakota Johnson, actress, attended the middle school
 Meghan, Duchess of Sussex, member of the British royal family and former actress

See also

 Immaculate Heart College

References

External links
Official Immaculate Heart High School Website

Educational institutions established in 1906
Roman Catholic secondary schools in Los Angeles County, California
Girls' schools in California
High schools in Los Angeles
1906 establishments in California
Los Feliz, Los Angeles
Catholic preparatory schools in California
Catholic secondary schools in California